Yul Spencer is an American actor, writer, comedian, stand-up comic and producer. He has appeared on BET's Comic View, Comedy Central's "Make Me Laugh", has a 1-Man show entitled "Ya Gotta Go Higher", appeared as Trent in Two Can Play That Game (2001), as Tyrez 'Spank' Wallace in The Shield, and on the TV Series Malcolm & Eddie. He also plays the role of the emcee in the Absolut Vodka "Lemon Drop" campaign alongside Ali Larter. Spencer also appears as one of the Judges in Megan Lee's Music Video for "Destiny", Directed by Timothy Tau.

Filmography
Megan Lee's Destiny (2011) - Judge Randy Spence
Tori & Dean: Inn Love (2008) (Associate Producer)
The Shield (2006) - Tyrez Spank Wallace
Show Me The Funny (2004) (TV Series) - Comedian
Romeo! (2003) (TV Series) - Jerome
Two Can Play That Game (2001) - Trent
Funny Futhermuckers in Concert, Volume 2 (2001) - Comedian
Malcolm & Eddie (1999) - Yul Lee Spencer
BET's Comic View - Himself
Comedy Central's Make Me Laugh - Himself

References

External links
Yul Spencer's Official Site
Shoshin Entertainment
Ya' Gotta Go Higher Official Site
What About Us? TV Official Site
Yul Spencer interview about his addiction and sobriety

Living people
Year of birth missing (living people)
American male film actors
American male television actors
American male comedians
21st-century American comedians